General elections were held in Mauritius on 10 December 2014 and resulted in a landslide victory for the Alliance Lepep coalition, which secured 47 of the elected seats under the leadership of Sir Anerood Jugnauth, while the PTR–MMM alliance  under Navin Ramgoolam only got 13 seats.

Prime Minister Navin Rangoolam lost his own seat and accepted defeat after voters rejected his proposals to boost presidential powers. Former president and Alliance Lepep leader, 84-year-old Anerood Jugnauth became prime minister in the Indian Ocean island nation. Alliance Lepep is a coalition led by the Mouvement Socialiste Militant (MSM) with other parties including the Parti Mauricien Social Démocrate (PMSD) and the Muvman Liberater (ML).

Background
Following the victory of the Alliance de L'Avenir in the 2010 elections, Navin Ramgoolam continued to govern as prime minister. However, during the period 2010-2014, the Mouvement Socialiste Militant (MSM) and the Parti Mauricien Social Démocrate (PMSD) left the coalition and the Labour Party continued to govern alone with a thin majority.

In September 2014, the leaders of the Labour Party and the Mouvement Militant Mauricien (MMM), Navin Ramgoolam and Paul Berenger, signed an agreement to enter into an electoral alliance for the next general election. The plan of this agreement vowed to push through constitutional changes giving greater power to the now-ceremonial role of president.

Soon after, the MSM, the PMSD and the Muvman Liberater (a new party formed from a break-up with the MMM due to their coalition with the PTR) formed a coalition to face the PTR-MMM Alliance in the next general election.

Prime Minister Ramgoolam advised the President Kailash Purryag to dissolve the National Assembly on 6 October 2014. The President announced that the elections would be held on 10 December.

Electoral system
The National Assembly has 62 elected members elected in 20 three-seat constituencies and one two-seat constituency (the island of Rodrigues). The elections are held using the block vote system, whereby voters have as many votes as there are seats available.

In addition to the elected members, the Electoral Supervisory Commission has the power to appoint a further eight members. The additional members are chosen from amongst the unsuccessful candidates who received the highest number of votes, and are appointed with the aim of balancing the parliamentary representation of different ethnic groups.

Campaign
The contest was mostly between the PTR–MMM alliance led by Navin Ramgoolam and the Alliance Lepep led by Anerood Jugnauth.

PTR-MMM coalition
The Labour Party (PTR) and Mouvement Militant Mauricien (MMM) alliance is led by Navin Ramgoolam and is based on an agreement of power sharing and the implementation of a Second Republic with a more presidential system.

The current system is purely based on the Westminster style of government where the head of state (being the President) is a ceremonial figurehead with very few executive powers. Under the PTR-MMM agreement, the new President would be elected through a single-round election across the country. Additional powers would include the prerogative to preside over the cabinet of ministers (currently led by the Prime Minister), dissolve the National Assembly, recommendations in various institutions including the appointment of ministers. The President would also be able to address the National Assembly as and when required, and would be elected for a 7-year term, as opposed to the five-year term served by the National Assembly.

While some political observers define this agreement as innovative (re-balancing the powers which are concentrated in the hands of the Prime Minister) and a unification of the population through votes (as both parties have similar electorates in numbers), other people mention that Ramgoolam had always favored a presidential system of government while Berenger had argued for a Second Republic since 1987.

The agreement concluded that if the coalition wins a three-quarters majority in parliament, a bill would be passed to implement the new republic, with Navin Ramgoolam resigning to present himself as a presidential candidate while Paul Berenger would replace him as Prime Minister.

The Labour Party and the MMM each proposed 30 candidates, with each party having either one or two candidates in every mainland constituency. Like other mainland parties, however, they did not contest the two seats allocated to the island of Rodrigues.

Alliance Lepep
The Alliance Lepep (Alliance of the People) is composed of three parties and is led by Anerood Jugnauth. It was formed as a response to the formation of the PTR-MMM alliance. The parties included in the alliance are as follows: 
Mouvement Socialiste Militant (MSM) - 40 candidates - led by Pravind Jugnauth
Parti Mauricien Social Démocrate (PMSD) - 13 candidates - led by Xavier Luc Duval
Muvman Liberater (ML) - 7 candidates - led by Ivan Collendavelloo

Program
The program of the Alliance was mainly on the following measures that would be taken if the Alliance formed the next government. They are as follows:

Review the Driver’s license penalty points system: 
The alliance maintained that the point system is inappropriate and that it misapplied and penalizes professional drivers. However, it does not say whether the system will be fully or partially abolished or new criteria will apply. 
Identity card "Data Bank" to be destroyed: 
As a citizen, Pravind Jugnauth initiated a case concerning the new identity card in the Supreme Court. He believes that giving and storing personal information including fingerprints and 3G scanned passport photos is an invasion of privacy. He promised that the “Data Bank” storing the data would be destroyed.
Implement a decrease in prices of Gasoline and diesel. 
Introduce private TV: 
The MSM-PMSD-ML alliance promised to introduce private television.
Arrange MBC: 
The MBC Act will be reviewed to increase more impartiality in political and national coverage in a view to protect free and fair election campaigns. 
Old age pension scheme at Rs 5000/month: 
The old age pension which is currently at Rs 3623 (US$115) per month will be increased to Rs 5000 (US$157) per month.
Syndicate police
Minimum Wage: 

Introduction of a minimum national wage rate, a policy that was implemented in 2018

Results
Results for the election were declared the day after the election. The Alliance Lepep secured 47 out of the 62 elected seats in the National Assembly, while the Alliance Ptr-MMM got 13, and the remaining two elected seats went to the Organisation du Peuple Rodriguais (OPR), according to official results. As per the system referred to as the 'Best Loser system', the Electoral Commissioner's Office designated 7 additional seats from the non-elected candidates to occupy the National Assembly based on the religious and ethnic declarations of the candidates not elected. The Alliance Lepep coalition obtained an additional 4 seats whilst the Alliance Ptr-MMM obtained an additional 3 seats.

936,975 individuals were registered to vote, and the participation rate was 74.11%.

Of the 47 constituency seats won by Alliance Lepep, 33 were won by the MSM, 7 by the PMSD and 7 by the ML, while all four top-up seats were taken by the PMSD. Of the 13 constituency seats won by the PTR/MMM alliance, nine were won by the MMM and four by the Labour Party, while all three top-up seats were taken by the MMM.

Aftermath
Soon after the result was declared, the Alliance Lepep leader, Anerood Jugnauth, said in a press conference that they will put the country back on track for another economic miracle and that they will start working on the program on which they have been elected. At 84 years of age, he will become prime minister for the third time in the history of Mauritius with six mandates (1982, 1983, 1987, 1991, 2000 and 2014), after having served from 1982 to 1995 and 2000 to 2003. He was also President of Mauritius from 2003 to 2012.

In a broadcast on the state-owned television station, Navin Ramgoolam conceded his loss and wished the winning team good luck.

References

Elections in Mauritius
Mauritius
General
Election and referendum articles with incomplete results